Fred Turner (born April 4, 1961) is an American academic. He is the Harry and Norman Chandler Professor of Communication at Stanford University, having formerly served as department chair.

Before joining Stanford as an associate professor, Turner taught Communication at Harvard University's John F. Kennedy School of Government and the Massachusetts Institute of Technology. He  earned  a B.A. in English and American Literature from Brown University, an M.A. in English from Columbia University, and a Ph.D. in Communication from the University of California, San Diego. In 2015, he was appointed as Harry and Norman Chandler Professor and Chair of the Department of Communication at Stanford.

Before joining academia, Turner worked as a journalist for over ten years writing for The Boston Phoenix and Boston Sunday Globe, among others.

Bibliography 

The Democratic Surround: Multimedia and American Liberalism from World War II to the Psychedelic Sixties (2013) 
From Counterculture to Cyberculture: Stewart Brand, the Whole Earth Network and the Rise of Digital Utopianism (2006) 
Echoes of Combat: Trauma, Memory, and the Vietnam War (Echoes of Combat: The Vietnam War in American Memory in 1996; revised 2nd ed. with new title 2001)

References

External links
 Personal Page of Fred Turner
 New York Times review of "From Counterculture to Cyberculture...
 http://www.edge.org/3rd_culture/bios/turner.html
 http://muse.jhu.edu/journals/technology_and_culture/v046/46.3turner.html
 The introduction to From Counterculture to Cyberculture
 An excerpt from The Democratic Surround

Living people
Stanford University faculty
Harvard Kennedy School faculty
Brown University alumni
Columbia Graduate School of Arts and Sciences alumni
1961 births